Sara Sara is a  volcano lying between Lake Parinacochas and the Ocoña River in Peru. It is situated in the Parinacochas Province and the Paucar del Sara Sara Province. The volcano formed during the Pleistocene during four different stages of volcanic activity, which constructed a volcanic edifice with an oval outline consisting of lava flows and lava domes. The volcano was glaciated during the last glacial maximum; it may still feature glaciers. The last eruption was about 14,000 years ago and future eruptions are possible. The volcano was worshipped by the local population, and an Inca mummy of a 15-year old girl was found on the summit by archaeologists.

Geography and geomorphology 

Sara Sara lies within the  sub-range of the Andes. Administratively, it is located in the Parinacochas and Paucar del Sara Sara Provinces of the Ayacucho Region, Peru.

The vents are aligned in north-northeast-south-southwest direction and are accompanied by lateral lava domes. These vents were the source of lava flows and block-and-ash flows generated by the collapse of lava domes. A pyroclastic cone of recent age is found on the mountain and a recent lava flow descends the eastern flank. The western flank is heavily eroded. West of the volcano is Lake Parinacochas to its east is the Ocoña River.

Glaciers 

Glacial cirques, glacial valleys and numerous moraines surround the volcano. The lowest moraines on the western flank occur at  while these on the eastern flank only reach , presumably because of the effects of later volcanism that erased other moraines. Some of these encompass closed depressions. A third set of moraines at higher elevations appears to correspond to the neoglacial.

Presently, it reaches  elevation at Sara Sara. Active rock glaciers extend below the snowline on the western and northern flanks, and inactive rock glaciers are found at lower elevations. Water used for irrigation originates at Sara Sara's foot.

Geology 

The Quaternary volcanoes of Peru are part of the Central Volcanic Zone (CVZ) of the Andes and Sara Sara is the northernmost member. The CVZ features consists of two arcs of volcanoes on both sides of the Western Cordillera and features composite volcanoes, lava domes and lava flows, of which El Misti, Huaynaputina, Sabancaya, Ticsani, Tutupaca, Ubinas and Yucamane have been active in historical times. Ampato, Chachani, Casiri, Coropuna and Sara Sara are dormant volcanoes. The volcanism is triggered by the subduction of the Nazca Plate underneath the South America Plate, which takes place off the western coast of South America.

The basement is formed by Precambrian and Paleozoic rocks, which are covered by Mesozoic and Cenozoic sediments and volcanites. A major geological lineament known as the Sara Sara lineament runs across the volcano in northwest-southeast direction.

A depression west of Sara Sara which contains the Laguna Parinacochas may be the source of the regional Caraveli ignimbrite that was emplaced 8-9 million years ago.

During its history, Sara Sara has produced andesite, dacite, rhyolite and trachyandesite, with dacite predominating during Quaternary eruptions. The rocks define a potassium-rich calc-alkaline suite. Phenocrysts in the rocks include amphibole, biotite, hornblende, iron-titanium oxide, plagioclase, quartz, sanidine and sphene, and both their quantity and chemistry varied between various stages of activity. The volcaniclastic rocks of Sara Sara define the Sara Sara Formation, a geological formation defined for the western sector of the volcano. The Sara Sara volcanics are sometimes considered part of the Barroso Group of volcanic rocks.

Climate, vegetation and economic activity 

Precipitation is seasonal and mostly falls during summer, at higher elevations in the form of hail and snow which covers the ground for months. There are no close weather stations, but above  elevation the climate is always cold with temperatures never rising above .

Trees grow at lower elevations, while only ichu and quinua are present above . Alfalfa and maize are cultivated at lower altitudes. Animal husbandry, small commerce and tourism complete the economic activities of the region.

Eruption history 

Sara Sara was active during the last 2 million years and produced the lower Barroso and Lampa Volcanics. Fresh lava and pyroclastic flows imply recent activity. The volcanic activity has been subdivided into four stages:
 Some publications define a first stage featuring lava flow and lava dome emissions.
 The first stage featured an alternation of explosive eruptions and effusive eruptions. Two events took place 500,000±270,000 and 370,000±150,000 years ago. It also featured a sector collapse in the northeastern sector of Sara Sara. 
 During the second stage lava domes grew and collapsed on the volcano, one such event occurred 162,000±20,000 years ago on the eastern flank.
 The third stage consisted of dacitic lava flows that built the actual cone of the volcano, beginning 63,000-58,000 years ago.
This flow is dated to 14,000±4,000 years ago.

Two pyroclastic flows dated to 44,500 and 49,200 years before present and lava flows with ages of 340,000±60,000 to 50,000±10,000 years ago. Sara Sara is currently classified as a dormant volcano and there is seismic activity. The occurrence of fumarolic activity was reported in 1963. Hot springs are found northeast of Sara Sara in the Quilcata valley and close to the town of Chacaraya, implying the presence of a shallow magma chamber.

Hazards and monitoring 

The volcano is considered to be "moderately dangerous" by the Peruvian Geological Service. Future eruptions may endanger a population of 12,000-8,000 around the volcano, which would be threatened by lahars, pyroclastic flows and tephra fallout. Aside from Pausa, other towns and Lake Parinacochas (an important source of water for the region) are located close to the volcano. Volcano hazard maps have been published. Since 2018, the volcano is monitored by the Peruvian Geological Service; Macedo Sánchez 2016 recommended seismic and other monitoring techniques for Sara Sara.

Archeology and religious importance 

The mountain was worshipped by local populations in and before Inca time, and the Inca performed human sacrifices on it. 
During Inca times it was part of the Kuntisuyu province.

According to the writings of a cleric Cristóbal de Albornoz, who beginning in 1570 wrote about local religious practices, the local population considered Sara Sara a sacred mountain and offered gold, silver, animals and servants to it. In 1996, archaeologists discovered a burial in a collapsed structure just northeast of the summit and recovered a body. This mummy was nicknamed "Sarita" and appears to be a 15-year old girl. It was accompanied by the remnants of offerings and the ice surrounding the body had melted. Additional offerings such as a llama and a silver object were also recovered from the summit.

Stone walls are found on the ridge at the summit of Sara Sara. They were initially described in 1982 by the archeologist Johan Reinhard, who described them on the northern summit. In 1941, copper objects were found on its flanks. The Yanapunku cave at  elevation features bones and ceramics from the Inca and Wari cultures. Incaptiana is a site at the top of a hill at  elevation where Inca buildings were identified.

See also 
 Inka Wasi
 List of volcanoes in Peru

References

Sources

External links
 
 
 

Andean Volcanic Belt
Archaeological sites in Ayacucho Region
Archaeological sites in Peru
Mountains of Ayacucho Region
Volcanoes of Peru